Oxford Forum is a research organisation based in Oxfordshire, England, founded in 1998 by Celia Green and three academic colleagues, to promote and publish dissident views in philosophy, psychology, economics and sociology.

Its current principal contributors, apart from Green, are Charles McCreery and Fabian Tassano.

Publications

Books
Celia Green, Advice to Clever Children. 
Celia Green, The Lost Cause: An Analysis of Causation. 
Celia Green, Letters from Exile: Observations on a Culture in Decline. 
Celia Green, The Human Evasion. 
Celia Green, The Decline and Fall of Science. 
Charles McCreery, The Abolition of Genius. Foreword by Professor H.J. Eysenck, PhD, DSc.
Fabian Tassano, The Power of Life or Death: Medical Coercion and the Euthanasia Debate. 
Fabian Tassano, Mediocracy: Inversions and Deceptions in an Egalitarian Culture.

Other publications
Celia Green, "Hindrances to the progress of research"
Celia Green, "Freedom and the exceptional child"
Charles McCreery, "Perception and Hallucination: The Case for Continuity"
Charles McCreery, "Dreams and Psychosis: a New Look at an Old Hypothesis" 
Charles McCreery, "The Chi-square test"
Charles McCreery, "Probability and Bayes' Theorem"
Charles McCreery, "Analysis of Variance"
Charles McCreery, "Mean, median, mode and skewness"
Charles McCreery, "The t-test and the Mann-Whitney U test"
Fabian Tassano, "The meaning of mediocracy"
Fabian Tassano, "The new academia"
Fabian Tassano, "Legal certainty"
Fabian Tassano, "Legal uncertainty and counter-terrorism"
Fabian Tassano, "Scapegoating the older generation"
Fabian Tassano, "Fairness and the triple lock"

External links

Bibliographic databases and indexes
Book publishing companies of the United Kingdom
Philosophical schools and traditions
Psychology organisations based in the United Kingdom